Yancowinna County is a rural locality in Unincorporated Far West and a civil parish of Yancowinna County in far western New South Wales.

The parish is at 31°56′45″S 141°21′41″E.

History
Nadbuck is part of the traditional lands of the Wiljali people.

The area was opened to European settlement after the discovery of minerals in the 19th century.

References

 
Mining towns in New South Wales
Towns in New South Wales
Far West (New South Wales)